Anti-M is a Santa Barbara based mostly electronic rock band. The band had the fortune of working with the late Ronnie Montrose; he played guitars as a guest on Anti-M's second album, Positively Negative.

History and description
The band's discography includes No Waves in Hell, Positively Negative, and It H-Hurts, the Instrumentals. A remastered version of Positively Negative features two bonus track instrumentals that include guitarist Ronnie Montrose who is known for forming the band Montrose and starting the career of singer Sammy Hagar. The album Damage was released in 2008. It features a guest performance by bassist Tim Landers who has played with various talent including Tori Amos, Vince Neil, Stevie Nicks, Al Di Meola and Billy Cobham, among others. Landers can be heard during the guitar solo on the title track. The style of the album is dark and gothic with a  mix of influences from bands like Within Temptation, Evanescence and electronica like Depeche Mode. In 2010 the band released the EP Damaged Little Things, an album of alternate takes and unreleased songs and demos

Anti-M have provided music for several films. They include You Only Die Once, a direct-to-video James Bond spoof, Hawaiian Surf Stories (a series of surf films from North Shore Oahu), and 
"The Bolt Who Screwed Christmas", an award-winning animated short written and directed by Anti-M founding member John "Wedge" Wardlaw.

A covers album  titled "Pieces" was released in 2019. Like "Damage" the cover art is by surreal artist Ora Tamir. The album features guest musicians and vocalists including Dru Allen, Mirabilis and Todd Simpson. Artists covered include Depeche Mode, Garbage, King Crimson, Delain, The Gathering, 'Til Tuesday, Berlin and Fur Patrol.

Members
John "Wedge" Wardlaw (1986— ): keyboards, vocals, guitar, bass
Mark Rumer (1986–1995): keyboards, programming, voice
Ruston (1992—2009): keyboards, vocals, bass
Steve "Salty" Weber (1992–1995): guitar
Jon (2005—2019): guitarist 
Barbara (1995—2019): vocals, guitar, bass
Derek Poultney (2005— ): drums, drum programming

Guest performers
Ronnie Montrose (1995): guitars on "Positively Negative"
Tim Landers (2008): bass on "Damage"
Nan Avant: piano on unreleased version of Love Reign O'er Me (The Who Cover)
Dru Allen: (vocalist for Mercury's Antennae, This Ascension; Mirabilis) sings on "Nighttime Birds" - The Gathering Cover, "Milk" - Garbage cover, "In Your Room" - Depeche Mode cover; on album "Pieces"
Alexa: Vocals on "See Me In Shadow" - Delain cover; on album "Pieces"
Todd Simpson: Various guitars on  album "Pieces"
Marcus Baertschi: Bass guitar on  album "Pieces"

Discography

Albums

References

External links
Official website
Anti-M videos at YouTube
Anti-M at MySpace
Anti-M at Facebook
Anti-M at Twitter

Rock music groups from California